Vincenzo Ferrari (died 1579) was a Roman Catholic prelate who served as Bishop of Umbriatico (1578–1579)
and Bishop of Montepeloso (1564–1578 and 1550–1561).

Biography
On 5 Nov 1550, Vincenzo Ferrari was appointed during the papacy of Pope Julius III as Bishop of Montepeloso. 
He resigned in 1561.
On 16 Oct 1564, he was reappointed during the papacy of Pope Pius IV as Bishop of Montepeloso.
On 2 Jun 1578, he was appointed during the papacy of Pope Gregory XIII as Bishop of Umbriatico.
He served as Bishop of Umbriatico until his death in 1579.

References

External links and additional sources
 (Chronology of Bishops) 
 (Chronology of Bishops) 
 (for Chronology of Bishops) 
 (for Chronology of Bishops) 

16th-century Italian Roman Catholic bishops
Bishops appointed by Pope Julius III
Bishops appointed by Pope Pius IV
Bishops appointed by Pope Gregory XIII
1579 deaths